Università Campus Bio-Medico di Roma is a for-profit college situated in , founded in 1993 and promoted by the Blessed Alvaro del Portillo, according to the principles of the Catholic prelature of the Opus Dei.

Opus Dei, through its doctrinal and spiritual formation activities supports the mission of the Athenaeum, promotes its Christian identity and spiritually assists those who work there and wish to do so.

The Site Of Campus Bio-Medico: Trigoria

The name comes from the Latin “tres gores” (three rivers) or, maybe, from an ancient sacred location derived from the Greek “tricore” (three-body buildings) or from the Greek  Τρι-οδια (Trivium).

The General Hospital at the university is located in the North-West part of Trigoria on fields partly 
sold and partly given by Alberto Sordi, at the borders of the Regional Park of Decima-Malafede.

In Rome there was not the necessary space to realize such a project, therefore Trigoria was considered the perfect solution for the upcoming innovations and the birth of the urban fabric.

However, many doctors had troubles reaching Trigoria considering its decentralized position.

The Project
Alvaro del Portillo, a well-known character of the Opus Dei, thought that Italy lacked of a place where the sick were assisted in a concrete way. The idea came from the founder of the Opus Dei, Josemaria Escriva who was inspired by the clinic belonging to the University of Navarra.

Being in contact with the clinic of Pamplona and the University of Navarra, the idea of sending medical students to improve their skills and approach towards healthcare was developed. 
Many members were added to the initial equipe, each of them loyal to the prelature and with a different task. Later on, medical doctors arrived from Navarra to strengthen the Spanish method in Italy.

The surgeon and professor of clinical pathology, Raffaello Cortesini, wanted to underline the connection between sanitary aid and scientific research. He also promoted the name of Campus Bio-Medico Romano in 1989. 
On December 19, 1990, sixteen members signed the deed of incorporation of Campus Bio-Medico association. The goal was to promote research in the biological and medical  fields by creating research centers, making human dignity and the right to life and health always a priority. 
 
“At the end we will have to found a university”.

These were the words pronounced by Luigi Altomare who, collaborating with Paolo Arullani, presented the application to establish a university with degree courses in nursing and medicine and surgery. 
The new association rented a wing of Lancellotti Palace, a place designated to teaching for the formation of the university step by step. Throughout Italy, a sort of propaganda began in favor of the new university and the best professors started to be recruited. 
The initial project was to create a University Hospital with 400 beds. However, Alvaro del Portillo was not in favor, because he thought that the best way was to proceed with caution.
Palazzo Lancellotti, relevant for its artistic architecture, was not suitable as a space for teaching, but the problem was solved with the initiative to use the Rome American Hospital as an educational area.

Alberto Sordi

In 1989 the negotiation between the Sordi brothers and the managers of Campus Bio-Medico was stipulated for the purchase of the land that would be used for the new project. 
Giuseppe Sordi, Alberto's brother, died in 1990. At this point Alberto decided to donate part of this land to the Campus, precisely eight hectares, giving life to a foundation: the Alberto Sordi Foundation. The latter was officially born on February 4, 1992, in Palazzo Lancellotti with the aim of protecting the care of elderly people and establishing the nursing school of which Alberto Sordi was the honorary president. There was a steering committee of which Calabrò, the current rector of the university, was a member.

In October 1998, under the gaze of the mayor of the city, the first stone was laid for the construction of the Center for the Health of the Elderly. In fact, he says “Those who suffer a lot are a weak and defenseless category like the elderly [...], there are older people than children”.  
In June 2000 the real inauguration of the structure occurred thanks to Ruggero Gozzani who became the director of the Alberto Sordi foundation.
In 2002 the Alberto Sordi foundation was named Alberto Sordi Onlus Association, of which the president is Antonio Polacco. 
With the death of Alberto Sordi, his sister Aurelia decided to manage the activity started by his brother and instituted a charity evening every 15 June, Alberto's birth date.

Volunteering
A key idea of the Campus is combining scientific knowledge to practice, by putting at the centre the human being. For this reason, since the foundation of the Campus, there have been different voluntary initiatives and plans to provide assistance for needy people.  
 
We can mention the episode happened in Umbria in 1997: a terrible earthquake that led to 10 deaths.  Eight students of the Campus (5 nursing students and 3 medicine and surgery students) left to take part into an aid initiative for Nocera Umbra, where they spend 5 days with the earthquake victims.

In 2001,  different courses were introduced to focus  on the topic of the voluntary activity and on the story of different doctors and nurses who gave important contribution to the voluntary field.

Nowadays, Campus Bio-Medico offers the possibility to send students in areas like Madagascar, Tanzania and Peru to help these developing countries.

The Birth of a new University

October 4, 1993 was the first day of class in Via Longoni.  A few days later, October 15, at Palazzo Lancellotti the beginning of the academic year of the University Institute Campus Bio-Medico was celebrated, followed by the ceremony of the current Beatus Alvaro del Portillo at the Basilica of Sant'Apollinare in Rome. The news of the beginning of the academic year was reported in the famous newspaper Corriere Della Sera. 
The Scientific Committee turned to  experts in the pedagogical field and student training, including Paola Binetti and Daniele Santini. 
Among the first teachers were the surgeon Augusto Arullani and the orthopedist Vincenzo Denaro and many others from European universities and La Sapienza in Rome. 
 Another novelty was the creation of numerous "integrated courses", still present nowadays, in which teachers from different disciplines collaborated to provide an even more complete practical and theoretical training.
Many student initiatives were organized throughout Italy to promote the new university and its mission, despite the limited number of admissions in its the first year: 40 students for Medicine and Surgery and 25 for Nursing Sciences. Elena Taglieri, an orthopedic surgeon at the Jewish hospital in Rome, received the serial number "001". Another element was combining scientific subjects with a  program of humanities to provide students with knowledge in the philosophical and religious fields because, despite the formation of the university, it wanted to remain civil and not ecclesiastical.

The Research
The prefix Bio, in the name of the newborn University, was used to indicate the desire to make this new structure an important research centre. In fact, in the following years, the research field would become one of the backbones of the university.

With the establishment of the First Scientific Committee, whose members came from numerous universities in Italy and all around the world, the research officially began. On January 28, 1995, the first research laboratory "Laboratorio Margherita Lama Caputo" was inaugurated. It became a reference centre for other universities until it was among the winners of the "Biomed-2" project.

Campus Bio-Medico participated with a project focused on the relationship between serotonin and autism, obtaining the first European funds for research. In September 1944, the first scientific research work was published in Rome in the "Proceedings of the VII National Congress of Medical Informatics".

Another milestone was reached with the inauguration of the Anatomy Laboratory for the study of organ microcirculation, directed by Professor Giulio Marinozzi: in this laboratory, many students had the opportunity to practice thanks to the hours of training that  were part of their curricula.

In January 1996 there was the first research competition of the Free University Institute Campus Bio-Medico in which a place was announced for research in the field of Human Anatomy. The competition was won by Sergio Morini.

In the same 1996, the research began to expand and other laboratories were opened, such as the one of hemodynamics directed by Germano Di Sciascio, and the university began to host seminars that had the theme of scientific progress at the centre. At the same time, alongside the Faculties of Medicine and Surgery and Nursing Sciences, the Degree Course in Engineering was being born, which would give a big boost to research activities to the birth of the Interdisciplinary Research Center (CIR) in 2000.

The General Hospital
“The General Hospital of the 21st century is born!”.

These were the words said by many Italian newspapers to spread the news of the birth of the third general hospital in Rome after University La Sapienza and Università Cattolica del Sacro Cuore.

Organizing a hospital was not easy, since it was necessary to move from a temporary structure to a definitive one.
The new general hospital was supposed to have two closely related entities: the outpatient activity for visits and day hospital, and the hospital wards.
What was about to be born was not a private clinic but a hospital which, in agreeing with the region of Lazio, would be open to everyone.

Despite the agreement was signed on December 5, 1994, it was still not possible to establish a starting date for the hospital activity due to bureaucratic difficulties.
This problem logically prevented medical and nursing students from starting the internships, therefore it was decided to appoint it to the hospital management.

Antonio Polacco was appointed as the director of the general hospital and on October 20, 1994, during the inauguration ceremony at Palazzo Lancellotti, the typical Anglo-Saxon experimental model was presented, divided into an inductive and a deductive phase of verification and diagnosis.
Then, on that very same day, the structure was inaugurated in via Longoni 83 and the first patients were admitted to the rented building of the Rome American Hospital, with 15 initial beds.

The first operational areas were three: medicine, general surgery and orthopedics, but everything had to be built, not only the wards of the hospital, but  it was necessary to follow the protocols.

One of the first episodes regarding the general hospital was told by Antonio Picardi: a patient was hospitalized and needed gamma globulins not available in pharmacies. Thanks to the help of pharmacists and, after various bureaucratic procedures, it was possible to obtain authorizations for various drugs.

In general, finding patients was not easy due to the location of the hospital and the recent inauguration.
At the beginning it was doctors, nurses and drivers who accompanied the patients, who were pleasantly surprised by the care received.

Another element that distinguished the new hospital was the consideration for the patient's family. Both in the ward and in the outpatient clinic, the visits were made in the presence of the closest relatives, considered essential for the reconstruction of the patient's clinical history.
The Campus put the patient at the centre, the motto was take care to cure and it was respected not only by the health personnel, but also by the administrative staff.

The first surgical operation was performed on December 22, 1994: a cervical disc herniation.
There was a competition to grab the primacy of the operation, but in the end Vincenzo Denaro from the orthopedics area was chosen.

A New Degree Course
Thanks to Vincenzo Lorenzelli, appointed as new Rector in 1998, at Campus Bio-Medico was created the Faculty of Biomedical Engineering.
 
Professor Lorenzelli, pioneer of the new faculty, was joined in his project by Marcella Trombetta, who collaborated in the creation of other degree courses that could fit the field of Medicine.
 
On September 1, 1999, the first admission exams were held and 42 students were admitted. 
 The lessons began in a rented building at the intersection of via Prenestina and via Longoni.
Domenico Formica, one of the first students, described the entrance tests saying that they were the same but the subjects were weighted differently depending on the faculty.

For those who wanted to attend engineering, mathematics and physics  had a greater weight, while for those who strived to become doctors biology was the most important subject.

The engineering lessons, at least for the first period, took place in a building that housed a warehouse of appliances.

Despite the difficult beginning, the Faculty of Engineering had important developments such as the collaboration with the Scuola Superiore Sant'Anna in Pisa and the arrival of promising researchers such as Eugenio Guglielmelli and Loredana Zollo.

Controversies 
The Campus, particularly its School of Specialization in Obstetrics and Gynecology, is under attack by AMICA (Association of Italian Doctors of Contraception and Abortion), the Luca Coscioni Association and the UAAR because it prohibits in its classrooms, having written it in its statutes (in the part called: Charter of Purposes), the teaching of the practice of abortion (as well as that of euthanasia, sterilization and artificial insemination), thus, in fact, imposing an institute conscientious objection, therefore no longer personal, against abortion on the trainees/graduates, in violation of the law on the subject. The aforementioned associations are asking the ministerial and university authorities, by appeal, that this campus therefore have its ministerial accreditation for the school of obstetrics and gynecology revoked.

Notes

References
 Andronico G., Borghi L., Sotto Questo Cielo. Appunti e ricordi sui primi anni dell’Università Campus Bio-medico di Roma,Roma, Edizione Università Campus Bio-Medico di Roma, Roma 2018

 Lettere dal Campus

 “Alberto Sordi regala un terreno per un nuovo ospedale”, Il Messaggero,27 agosto 1991

 Escrivà,Josemaria,Colloqui,Edizioni Ares,Milano 1987

Universities and colleges in Rome
Universities established in the 1990s
Educational institutions established in 1993